ELCHK Lutheran Secondary School (ELCHKLSS) is a secondary school in King's Park, Yau Tsim Mong District, Hong Kong near Yau Ma Tei station.

History
ELCHK Lutheran Secondary School was founded in 1958 and moved to the current site at No. 52, Waterloo Road, Kowloon in 1964. The architecture is an exemplar of the Bauhaus style.

See also
 Evangelical Lutheran Church of Hong Kong

References

External links

 Official website 

Protestant secondary schools in Hong Kong
Hong Kong
King's Park, Hong Kong
Yau Tsim Mong District